A referendum was held in Okinawa Prefecture on 24 February 2019. The referendum asked whether voters approved or opposed the landfill work at Henoko Bay for the construction of a new United States Marine Corps base. This is the second prefecture-wide referendum in Okinawa, the first being the 1996 referendum on the reduction of US military presence. Governor Denny Tamaki announced the referendum in November 2018, fulfilling his manifesto promise from his successful campaign for governor.

The Okinawan electorate voted to overwhelmingly reject the central government's Henoko move plan. 72% of Okinawan voters opposed the plan, with 19% supporting the plan. The Oppose vote also passed the 25% electorate threshold, which means the governor is obliged to respect the result and to convey it to the Prime Minister of Japan and the President of the United States. However, the central government is not legally obliged to respect the result.

Referendum question and options
The ballot asked voters to decide: 

Voters had three options: Support, Oppose and "No opinion either way". It was initially proposed that the referendum had two straight options: Support or Oppose. 5 conservative-aligned mayors of Okinawa City, Uruma, Ginowan, Miyakojima and Ishigaki protested at this plan and threatened to exclude their cities from the referendum. A compromise was reached in January to include the third "No opinion either way" option. The dispute caused a delay on the preparations for the vote in the 5 municipalities. Although a separate voting date for those municipalities was expected initially, the referendum preparations there were finished on time and they will hold the referendum on the same day as the rest of the prefecture.

Early voting was available from 15 to 23 February.

Petition 
On 8 December 2018, Okinawan-Hawaiian activist Robert Kajiwara created a petition titled, "Stop the landfill of Henoko/Oura Bay until a referendum can be held in Okinawa" on the White House's We the People petitioning portal. On 18 December, the petition got 100,343 signatures, reaching the necessary number of signatures for it to be reviewed and receive a response by the White House. The petition was drawn to attention by multiple individuals who signed it. People such as Brian May, Rola, Ryuichi Sakamoto, Daisuke Muramoto, Ryucheru, and others have openly expressed their support. The petition received over 200,000 signatures by the end of January. As of February 24 (date of referendum), the White House has not given a response.

Kajiwara was detained and interrogated by Japanese immigration officers when he came to Japan in February 2019 to campaign in the referendum.

Endorsements

Support

Parties 
Liberal Democratic Party

Individuals 
Kosaburo Nishime, member of the House of Representatives for Okinawa 4th district.

Oppose

Parties 
Constitutional Democratic Party

Individuals 
Denny Tamaki, incumbent governor of Okinawa
Ryuichi Sakamoto, composer
Brian May, guitarist of Queen
Rola, model and actress

No opinion either way

Opinion polling

Results

Breakdown

Aftermath 
The day following the referendum, Prime Minister Shinzo Abe said that while the central government respected the result, construction works at Henoko would continue. This statement was reaffirmed by Chief Cabinet Secretary Yoshihide Suga and Minister of Defense Takeshi Iwaya. Construction works at Henoko also restarted straight away, causing indignation among the local populace who voted heavily to oppose it.

References 

Okinawa
Okinawan referendum
Okinawan referendum
Referendums in Japan
Elections in Okinawa Prefecture